Dyspessa albosignata is a species of moth of the family Cossidae. It was described by Rothschild in 1912. It is found in Transcaspia, where it has been recorded from Turkmenistan and southern Iran.

References

Moths described in 1912
Moths of Asia
Dyspessa